WOC may refer to:
WAN Optimization Controller
The World of Cars Online
Homogeneous water oxidation catalysis
World Orienteering Championships
World of Coca-Cola
World of Color, a nighttime show at Disney California Adventure Park
Willys Overland Crossley, a British vehicle manufacturer active between 1919 and 1934
Wonders of Chiropractic, former slogan of Palmer College of Chiropractic and the namesake for the WOC broadcasting stations in Davenport, Iowa, United States
WOC (AM), a radio station (1420 AM) licensed to Davenport, Iowa, United States
WLLR-FM, a radio station (103.7 FM) licensed to Davenport, Iowa, United States, which held the call sign WOC-FM from October 1948 to February 1972
KWQC-TV, a television station (channel 36 digital/6 virtual) licensed to Davenport, Iowa, United States, which held the call sign WOC-TV from October 1949 to December 1986
 Women of color, a term used to collectively describe women who are not white; see Person of color
 William Orcutt Cushing, American hymn writer